Marton is a town in the Rangitikei district of the Manawatū-Whanganui region of New Zealand's North Island. It is situated 35 kilometres southeast of Whanganui and 40 kilometres northwest of Palmerston North.

Ngāti Apa are tangata whenua for the Marton area.

The town of Marton is the largest in the Rangitikei district, and began life as a private township in 1866, when shop and housing sections were sold at auction by local landowners.

The town had  residents as of 

Marton has always been a service town for the fertile farming region of the Manawatu Plains. Butter, wool, and flour have been among its agricultural products. The arrival of the railway in 1878 led to rapid growth in the area, which soon added industries such as engineering, sawmilling, and textile production to its economy.

History

For three years the small village was known as Tutaenui, named after the stream running through its centre. In 1869 local citizens changed the name to Marton to honour the birthplace of Captain James Cook in Middlesbrough, marking his landing in New Zealand exactly 100 years earlier. It is not known if this change of name was influenced by the mistranslation of 'tutae' (meaning 'dung') and 'nui' (meaning 'large'). (Actual translation: 'tu' -stand, 'tae' -arrive, 'nui' big; i.e., a 'big gathering').

From the start Marton was an ideal supply centre for district farmers, who first began arriving in the early 1850s. From butter and wool they moved on to growing wheat in 1863, and big crops led to three flourmills being launched in the area in 1864.

After the town itself opened up in 1866, general stores, two hotels and several blacksmiths soon started. Marton became a home base for the horse industry, with saddlers, wheelwrights, livery stables and coachbuilders competing for business, while Clydesdale and Suffolk Punch sires toured the district to build up the population of plough horses needed as new farms sprang into being.

The opening of the railway line joining Wanganui to Palmerston North in 1878, now part of the North Island Main Trunk railway (towards Palmerston North and Auckland) and the Marton - New Plymouth Line (towards Wanganui), turned Marton Railway Station into a thriving railway junction, and it held that position for the next 100 years. The move of the railway station in 1898 was followed by a large development of 'Marton Extension', to the south east, from 1907.

Timber from Rangitikei forests served the town's two timbermills, the first from 1889 onwards.

Industry developed quietly at first in Marton, starting with flourmilling, brickmaking and wool presses. By the late 1950s there was an incredible array of industries and factories in action. They turned out products as diverse as men's shirts, tractor safety cabs, soft drinks, vegetable salads, readymix concrete, field tiles, dog biscuits, knitwear, dried peas, electronic petrol pumps, vegetable digging machinery.

9 km from Marton was the large Lake Alice Hospital for psychiatric patients, which opened in 1950 and closed in 1999. It included a maximum security unit, and housed hundreds of patients during its 49 years of operation.

Newspapers 
Marton’s first newspaper, the Rangitikei Advocate and Manawatu Argus, was started in 1875, with Alexander McMinn as editor. From 1891 to 1896 there was also the Mercury, published by Francis Arkwright. From 1903 to 1905 the Rangitikei Advocate was associated with the Farmers’ Advocate, a weekly published in Marton that was the official voice of the newly formed New Zealand Farmers’ Union. The Rangitikei Advocate closed on 1 February 1941. The weekly Rangitikei News ran from 1948 to 1955. It was replaced by the Rangitikei Mail. Feilding-Rangitīkei Herald now serves the area.

Geography

Climate 
Marton's climate is temperate and has few extremes compared to many parts of New Zealand. Summers are warm with average temperatures in the low 20s. The most settled weather occurs in summer and early autumn. Winters are mild and annual rainfall is moderate. Annual hours of bright sunshine can average over 2,000.

Demographics

It had a population of 5,268 at the 2018 New Zealand census, an increase of 474 people (9.9%) since the 2013 census, and an increase of 336 people (6.8%) since the 2006 census. There were 2,037 households. There were 2,571 males and 2,697 females, giving a sex ratio of 0.95 males per female, with 1,047 people (19.9%) aged under 15 years, 864 (16.4%) aged 15 to 29, 2,112 (40.1%) aged 30 to 64, and 1,245 (23.6%) aged 65 or older.

Ethnicities were 75.9% European/Pākehā, 23.7% Māori, 9.9% Pacific peoples, 2.6% Asian, and 1.5% other ethnicities (totals add to more than 100% since people could identify with multiple ethnicities).

The proportion of people born overseas was 16.1%, compared with 27.1% nationally.

Although some people objected to giving their religion, 42.5% had no religion, 42.2% were Christian, 0.3% were Hindu, 0.3% were Muslim, 0.2% were Buddhist and 4.6% had other religions.

Of those at least 15 years old, 411 (9.7%) people had a bachelor or higher degree, and 1,212 (28.7%) people had no formal qualifications. The employment status of those at least 15 was that 1,641 (38.9%) people were employed full-time, 609 (14.4%) were part-time, and 183 (4.3%) were unemployed.

Rural surrounds

The statistical area of Marton Rural, which covers  around Marton, had a population of 987 at the 2018 New Zealand census, an increase of 24 people (2.5%) since the 2013 census, and an increase of 63 people (6.8%) since the 2006 census. There were 381 households. There were 507 males and 480 females, giving a sex ratio of 1.06 males per female. The median age was 45.4 years (compared with 37.4 years nationally), with 192 people (19.5%) aged under 15 years, 120 (12.2%) aged 15 to 29, 483 (48.9%) aged 30 to 64, and 189 (19.1%) aged 65 or older.

Ethnicities were 94.2% European/Pākehā, 8.8% Māori, 2.7% Pacific peoples, 0.6% Asian, and 0.6% other ethnicities (totals add to more than 100% since people could identify with multiple ethnicities).

The proportion of people born overseas was 9.1%, compared with 27.1% nationally.

Although some people objected to giving their religion, 45.6% had no religion, 43.2% were Christian, 0.3% were Hindu and 2.4% had other religions.

Of those at least 15 years old, 126 (15.8%) people had a bachelor or higher degree, and 147 (18.5%) people had no formal qualifications. The median income was $34,500, compared with $31,800 nationally. The employment status of those at least 15 was that 435 (54.7%) people were employed full-time, 147 (18.5%) were part-time, and 18 (2.3%) were unemployed.

Government and politics

Local government

The current Mayor of the Rangitikei District is Andy Watson. Marton is served by four ward councillors on the Rangitikei District Council; these are Cath Ash, Nigel Belsham, Dave Wilson and Lynne Sheridan. All were elected at the 2016 local elections and are due for re-election in October 2019.

National government
Marton is located in the general electorate of Rangitīkei and in the Māori electorate of Te Tai Hauāuru. Rangitīkei is a safe National Party seat since the 1938 election with the exception of 1978–1984 when it was held by Bruce Beetham of the Social Credit Party. Since 2011 it is held by Ian McKelvie.

Te Tai Hauāuru is a more volatile seat, having been held by three different parties since 1996, i.e. New Zealand First, the Māori Party and the Labour Party. Since 2014 it is held by Adrian Rurawhe of the Labour Party.

Culture

Sports
Marton has four sports clubs: Marton Cricket Club, Marton Rugby and Sports Club, Marton Bears Rugby League Club and Marton United AFC.

Transport

The nearest airports to the town are Whanganui Airport, located 37 km west, and Palmerston North Airport, located 44 km southeast. Both airports are domestic only.

Marton is on the North Island Main Trunk Line; and on the Marton-New Plymouth Line which leaves the NIMT at Marton. However although the Overlander on the NIMT used to stop at Marton railway station, the replacement Northern Explorer introduced in 2012 has fewer stops and does not stop at Marton.

Education

There are also two other primary schools.

Until 2016 there was a third secondary school, Turakina Māori Girls' College.

Notable people

Francis Arkwright, politician
Bruce Beetham, Social Credit politician
Iris Crooke, Nurse, Florence Nightingale Medal, Volunteer
Israel Dagg, All Black
Sir Michael Fowler, Architect, former Mayor of Wellington
James Laurenson, actor
Kaleb Ngatoa, Racing Driver
Launcelot Eric Richdale, former ornithologist
Norman Shelton, National MP

Further reading

See also
List of schools in Manawatū-Whanganui
Mayor of Rangitikei
2013 Rangitikei local elections

Footnotes

External links

Rangitikei Mail

Populated places in Manawatū-Whanganui
Rangitikei District